Herbert Haag (11 February 1915 – 23 August 2001) was a Swiss Roman Catholic theologian and biblical scholar of German origin.

Haag was born in Singen am Hohentwiel. After studying theology in Paris for the diocese of Basel in 1940, he was ordained a priest and worked for several years as a pastor in Lucerne. In 1942, Haag attained his PhD at the University of Fribourg. From 1948 to 1960, he taught Old Testament studies at the Theological Faculty of Lucerne, and from 1960 to 1980 he held the chair of Old Testament at the Catholic Theological Faculty at the University of Tübingen. Haag in particular as biblical scholars and exegete known, among other things, he published a well-known Bible dictionary. In his 1969 book on Farewell to the devil : from the Christian dealing with evil, he is noted for being the first Catholic theologian in the modern era to deny the existence of the devil, and to deny it as constitutive of the Christian faith, claiming it to be merely linked to a cultural frame inherited from both Judaism and paganism, a position which was criticized by then Cardinal Ratzinger. The Pope Paul VI answered in a rescript of the Congregation for the Doctrine of the Faith in 1972 about the topic of the existence of the devil, showing the error of his theological position. He also criticized dogmas of the church doctrine, such as original sin, apostolic succession, homosexuality, celibacy of the clergy and the ban on the ordination of women. In his last years he emerged as a critic of the institutional church.

In 1981, he signed an open letter to Swiss newspapers contending that a wrong had been done to Hans Küng in 1979, when the Vatican decreed that Küng was no longer recognised as a Catholic theologian because of his denial of papal infallibility. In 1985, he established the Herbert Haag Foundation for "freedom in the Church", which awards the Herbert Haag Prize. He died in Lucerne, aged 86.

Works
 editor, Bibel-Lexikon. 2nd edition. Einsiedeln and Zurich: Benziger, 1968.
 Biblische Schöpfungslehre und kirchliche Erbsündenlehre. Stuttgarter Bibelstudien 10. Stuttgart: Katholisches Bibelwerk, 1966; 4th edition 1968. and

Awards
 2000:Prix Courage
 2001:Pin of Lucerne

See also
 Original sin § Criticism

References

External links
 Victor Conzemius: Herbert Haag (theologian) in the Historical Dictionary of Switzerland
 A theologian of a special kind (imprimatur 11/2001)
 Herbert Haag-Foundation
 Audio recordings with Herbert Haag in the Online Archive of the Österreichische Mediathek (Interviews and lectures in German). Retrieved 2 September 2019

Dissident Roman Catholic theologians
1915 births
2001 deaths
20th-century Swiss Roman Catholic priests
20th-century Swiss Roman Catholic theologians
Academic staff of the University of Tübingen